Sir Christopher Simon Courtenay Stephenson Clarke (born 14 March 1947) was a British judge of the Court of Appeal of England and Wales from 2013 to 2017.

He was educated at Marlborough College and Gonville and Caius College, Cambridge.

He was called to the bar at Middle Temple in 1969, and served as a judge of the High Court of Justice (Queen's Bench Division) from 2005 to 2013. He has been a judge of the Court of Ecclesiastical Causes Reserved since 2015.

References

1947 births
Living people
People educated at Marlborough College
Alumni of Gonville and Caius College, Cambridge
Members of the Middle Temple
Queen's Bench Division judges
Lords Justices of Appeal
Knights Bachelor
Members of the Privy Council of the United Kingdom